Daniel John Kitson (born 2 July 1977) is an English comedian and writer.

Early life
Daniel John Kitson was born in Denby Dale on 2 July 1977, the son of a primary school headteacher mother and a lecturer father. He was a pupil at Scissett Middle School and Shelley College. He subsequently studied drama at Roehampton Institute, now known as the University of Roehampton.

Career

Comedy

Kitson began performing comedy at the age of 16. He was nominated for the 2001 Perrier Comedy Award at the Edinburgh Festival Fringe for his show Love, Innocence and the Word Cock before winning it in 2002 for the show Something.

As well as stand up, Kitson has written and performed "story shows". The first was A Made Up Story at the 2003 Edinburgh Festival Fringe, followed by Stories For the Wobbly-Hearted at the Melbourne International Comedy Festival in 2005. The latter show opened at the Traverse Theatre for the 2005 Edinburgh Festival Fringe and won a Scotsman Fringe First Award. In 2006, Kitson took Stories for the Wobbly Hearted to the Brits Off Broadway Festival in New York. In June 2006 the story show made up one half of his Regents Park Open Air Theatre appearance, where Kitson's stories were accompanied by songs from Gavin Osborn. His story show, C-90, opened at the Traverse for the 2006 Edinburgh Festival Fringe. It was awarded both a Fringe First and The Stage Acting Award for Best Solo Show.

In 2007, Kitson toured It's The Fireworks Talking and the story show C-90 in the UK, Australia, New York and Paris. There was a second Open Air Theatre show in June 2007. Kitson also complemented his Australian tour of C-90 with a loosely structured stand-up show titled At 10 pm, Daniel Kitson Will Be Drinking Tea and Blowing Minds, a reference to a line from the movie Dazed and Confused.

It's The Fireworks Talking won Kitson the Barry Award – named after veteran Australian comedian Barry Humphries – at the 2007 Melbourne International Comedy Festival. C90 was awarded an Argus Angel Award at the 2007 Brighton Festival.

In the first half of 2008 Kitson toured his show The Impotent Fury of the Privileged. He played work-in progress gigs in January and early February before presenting the show at 28 dates during May & June. The show was released as an audio download in January 2017.

In July 2008 he began previews of his Edinburgh Festival show, 66A Church Road: A Lament, Made Of Memories And Kept In Suitcases.

In 2009 Kitson performed two new shows: We Are Gathered Here & The Interminable Suicide of Gregory Church, the latter of which was toured in late 2010 and the first half of 2011. Prior to this in early 2010, Kitson also did a short UK tour of 66a Church Road  – A Lament Made of Memories and Kept in Suitcases that he initially performed in Edinburgh in 2008 (and then took to Australia.)

In January 2012, his show It’s Always Right Now, Until it’s Later played at the St. Ann's Warehouse in Brooklyn, NY.

In March 2012, Kitson took a brand new stand-up show, Where Once Was Wonder, on a work-in-progress tour around the UK before touring it in Australia and returning for the Edinburgh Fringe in August. The new show comprises all new material and is made up of three stories about "the impossible".

In 2013 he took his new stand-up show entitled After the Beginning. Before the End on a UK tour and also played a few European dates.

Kitson debuted his new play Mouse: The Persistence of an Unlikely Thought at Liverpool Everyman in 2016.

in 2017, Kitson performed his first stand-up comedy in over four years at The Roundhouse in July 2017 before taking it to The Royal Exchange, Manchester. The show, Something Other Than Everything, was largely well-reviewed, though received criticism from a Guardian journalist who objected to an in-context use of the word 'paki'.

In 2019, Daniel Kitson performed a run at the Battersea Arts Centre for a show entitled Keep. The premise of this show was to read aloud a catalogued list of 20,000 objects in his home, but in true Kitson style an extra narrative and much humour is delivered along the way.

In 2020, during a period where many UK venues were closed due to the COVID-19 pandemic, Kitson toured a new show Dot. Dot. Dot. to a series of theatres and comedy clubs, performing without a live audience, but streamed to online ticket-holders that were limited to the capacity of the venues. The show consisted of Kitson, sat at a table covered in Post-it Notes and Polaroid photos, holding them up one-by-one as he covered vignettes of personal experiences from the start of the pandemic up until the moment of performance.

In April 2022, Kitson announced a return to the stage after 2 years. With his new show Outside, he toured outdoor venues in the UK in his first live performances since the start of the pandemic.

Film and television
Kitson appeared in an episode of That Peter Kay Thing, "The Arena", and as Spencer in Peter Kay's Phoenix Nights. He also played a bus driver in the 2001 film Dog Eat Dog.

In 2007, clips of Daniel Kitson's stand-up were shown on the one-off Channel 4 show 100 Greatest Stand-Ups where he came 27th. In an updated version of the poll in 2010, he was voted 23rd. Chris Addison commented that 'Kitson is the finest comedian of his generation'. Stewart Lee also commented, after seeing a stand-up set by Kitson, that he saw stand-up 'about as good as it could get'.

Whilst in his teens, he appeared as a contestant on the ITV quiz show Blockbusters.

Kitson voices an "alley rat" in the pilot episode of the Kristen Schaal and Kurt Braunohler comedy Penelope: Princess of Pets which was aired in 2010 by Channel 4.

Radio
In 2006, Kitson began presenting his own weekly music-based radio show called The Listening Club. The show, broadcast live 1 am to 4 am on Monday nights / Tuesday mornings from London's community arts radio station Resonance FM, mainly involves music from his own collection (some played directly from his iPod), and occasional clips of comedy. In between tracks he talks about the music, tells anecdotes, and responds to the SMS text messages and e-mails that are sent in throughout the show. There were six shows in the original January / February 2006 run, with further instalments in October 2006 and February 2007. Kitson returned to Resonance FM in early 2013 on Tuesdays from midnight to 2:30 am. The show is only broadcast once with no repeat or accompanying podcast to ensure that audiences hear the show only once to make it more special, he also requests that no one record the show. The show returned in September 2016 under the title "Captain Bang Bang's Magic Castle" for a run of five weeks. This run of shows was subject to a number of mishaps which resulted in Kitson only broadcasting for one hour of the fifth show due to missing his train and missing the entire final show due to not being able to enter the Resonance FM radio station. As with the original run the show was not archived or repeated. In 2018 it was announced that for three weeks in May, Kitson would host an early morning weekday show on Resonance FM called "A Reason To Wake Up". These limited breakfast show runs were repeated in May 2019 and May 2020. In August 2020, Kitson presented "Trifle", which he said he created "because August is an odd month to be in my house". This was broadcast on Resonance FM between midnight and 1.30 GMT. Although it was originally stated that the shows would be available for listening after broadcast, in a change of plan none of these shows were subsequently archived or repeated.

Kitson had originally begun doing radio shows in Australia during the 2005 Melbourne International Comedy Festival, on Melbourne-based community station 3RRR. These continued, twice weekly, in 2006 and 2007. The Australian programmes are usually co-hosted with a comedian friend. Co-hosts have included Courteney Hocking, David O'Doherty, Andrew McClelland and Steve Hall of We Are Klang.

He has appeared on the BBC Radio 4 show Loose Ends.

Kitson appears in Episode 2 of the Flight of the Conchords radio series.

He also can be heard on the BBC Radio 4 programme Tim Key Delves Into Daniil Kharms and That's All.

Personal life 
Kitson has a stutter.

Live shows

Recordings 
Kitson has released audio and video recordings of some of his live shows on Bandcamp and Vimeo:

Audio

The Ballad of Roger and Grace w/ Gavin Osborn (2012)

Midnight at The Stand (2012)

Dancing (2012)

Weltanschauung (2012)

After the Beginning, Before the End. (2015)

The Impotent Fury of The Privileged (2017)

It's The Fireworks Talking (2020)

We Are Gathered Here (2021)

Shenanigan (2022) - Vinyl/CD/Cassette only

Video

It's Always Right Now, Until It's Later. (2018)

The Interminable Suicide of Gregory Church (2020)

Stories for the Wobbly Hearted (2020)

Tree (2023) 

Outside (Upcoming)

(Years are of the recording's release; years of the corresponding live shows are listed in the 'live shows' section.)

References

External links
Daniel Kitson's Website
2005 Scotland on Sunday interview
2006 Scotland On Sunday interview
2007 Scotsman interview
Jokes aside, Kitson is the best (2007 Barry Award win)

1977 births
Living people
English male comedians
English stand-up comedians
People from Denby Dale
Alumni of the University of Roehampton
20th-century English comedians
21st-century English comedians